The 2013 JSM Challenger of Champaign–Urbana was a professional tennis tournament played on hard courts. It was the twelfth edition of the tournament which was part of the 2013 ATP Challenger Tour. It took place in Champaign, United States between 11 and 17 November 2013.

Singles main-draw entrants

Seeds

 1 Rankings are as of November 4, 2013.

Other entrants
The following players received wildcards into the singles main draw:
  Marcos Giron
  Jared Hiltzik
  Tim Kopinski
  Dennis Nevolo

The following players got into the singles main draw as an alternate:
  Sanam Singh

The following players received entry from the qualifying draw:
  Daniel Smethurst
  Dimitar Kutrovsky
  Joshua Milton
  Evan King

Champions

Singles

 Tennys Sandgren def.  Samuel Groth 3–6, 6–3, 7–6(7–5)

Doubles

 Edward Corrie /  Daniel Smethurst def.  Austin Krajicek /  Tennys Sandgren 7–6(7–5), 0–6, [10–7]

External links
Official Website

JSM Challenger of Champaign-Urbana
JSM Challenger of Champaign–Urbana
JSM Challenger of Champaign-Urbana
JSM Challenger of Champaign-Urbana
JSM Challenger of Champaign-Urbana